In U.S. land surveying under the Public Land Survey System (PLSS), a section is an area nominally , containing , with 36 sections making up one survey township on a rectangular grid.

The legal description of a tract of land under the PLSS includes the name of the state, name of the county, township number, range number, section number, and portion of a section. Sections are customarily surveyed into smaller squares by repeated halving and quartering. In 1832 the smallest area of land that could be acquired was reduced to the  quarter-quarter section, and this size parcel became entrenched in American mythology. After the Civil War, freedmen (freed slaves) were reckoned to be self-sufficient with "40 acres and a mule." In the 20th century real estate developers preferred working with  parcels. The phrases "front 40" and "back 40," referring to farm fields, indicate the front and back quarter-quarter sections of land.

A section can be halved seven times in this way, down to a  parcel, or half of a quarter-quarter-quarter section—an easily surveyed 50-square-chain (2 ha) area. This system was of great practical value on the American frontier, where surveyors often had a shaky grasp of mathematics and were required to work quickly.

A description of a quarter-quarter section in standard abbreviated form, might look like "NW 1/4, NE 1/4, Sec. 34, T.3S, R.1W, 1st P.M." or, alternatively, "34-3-1 NW4NE4 1PM". In expanded form this would read "the Northwest quarter of the Northeast quarter of Section 34 of Township 3 South, Range 1 West, first Principal Meridian".

History
The existence of section lines made property descriptions far more straightforward than the old metes and bounds system.

The importance of "sections" was greatly enhanced by the passage of "An Ordinance for ascertaining the mode of disposing of lands in the Western Territory" of 1785 by the U.S. Congress (see Land Ordinance of 1785). This law provided that lands outside the then-existing states could not be sold, otherwise distributed, or opened for settlement prior to being surveyed. The standard way of doing this was to divide the land into sections.  An area six sections by six sections would define a township. Within this area, one section was designated as school land. As the entire parcel would not be necessary for the school and its grounds, the balance of it was to be sold, with the monies to go into the construction and upkeep of the school.

On May 20, 1862, President Abraham Lincoln signed into law the Homestead Act, by which settlers could "claim" 160 acres (a quarter section) of public land. Claimants were required to "live on" and “improve” their plot by cultivating the land. After five years, the original filer of the claim was entitled to the property, free and clear, except for a small registration fee.

Roads and urban planning

Numbering within a township

Every township is divided into 36 sections, each usually  square.  Sections are numbered boustrophedonically within townships as follows (north at top):

Section subdivisions
For instance, the southwest quarter of a section is named SW 1/4.

Sections can be further broken up into  blocks, or quarter-quarter sections. These add a second intercardinal direction label. For instance, the southeast quarter of the southwest quarter section mentioned above is labeled SE 1/4, SW 1/4:

Measurement anomalies
The curvature of the earth makes it impossible to superimpose a regular grid on its surface, as the meridians converge toward the North Pole. As the U.S. is in the Northern Hemisphere, if a section's or township's east and west sides lie along meridians, its north side is shorter than its south side. As sections were surveyed from south and east to north and west, accumulated errors and distortions resulted on the north and west lines, and north and west sections diverge the most from the ideal shape and size.

The entire township grid shifts to account for the earth's curvature. Where the grid is corrected, or where two grids based on different principal meridians meet, section shapes are irregular.

Sections also differ from the PLSS ideal of one square mile for other reasons, including errors and sloppy work by surveyors, poor instrumentation, and difficult terrain. In addition, the primary survey tool was the magnetic compass, which is influenced by local irregularities.

Once established, even an imperfect grid remains in force, mainly because the monuments of the original survey, when recovered, hold legal precedent over subsequent resurveys.

Alternatives and legacy systems
The Public Land Survey System was not the first to define and implement a survey grid. A number of similar systems were established, often using terms like section and township but not necessarily in the same way. For example, the lands of the Holland Purchase in western New York were surveyed into a township grid before the PLSS was established. In colonial New England land was often divided into squares called towns or townships, and further subdivided into parcels called lots or sections.

Sections are also used in land descriptions in the portion of northwestern Georgia that was formerly part of the territory of the Cherokee Nation. They are not, however, part of the PLSS and are irregular in shape and size. See Cherokee County, Georgia for more information on the historical reasons for this.

Another exception to the usual use of sections and section numbering occurs when most of a parcel, or lot, falls under a body of water. The term "government lot" is used for such parcels and they are usually described separately from the rest of the section using single numbers (such as "Government Lot 5 of Section 15"). Also, parcels within a platted subdivision are often specified by lot number rather than using PLSS descriptions.

Where Spanish land grants in Florida have descriptions that predate PLSS or even the U.S. itself, deviation from typical section numbering and size and shape often takes place. In an effort to honor these land grants after the U.S. took control of Florida, surveyors would use descriptions from confirmed land grants to establish their initial boundaries and created PLSS sections that extrapolated from those lines. Often, the amount of land left over in areas immediately surrounding the grants was grossly undersized or awkwardly shaped. Those tracts are referred to as "fractional sections" and often are not subject to township or range definitions. An example of such a legal description's beginning would read "Being a portion of Fractional Sec. 59, Township 0 South, Range 0 West".

Also, land north of the Watson Line near the Georgia border was not subject to the standard U.S. section, township and range designations, since the State of Georgia had claimed and laid out counties and surveyed its public lands south to that line into what eventually became part of the State of Florida.  The exact location of the Georgia–Florida state line was ultimately confirmed by an Act of Congress, approved April 9, 1872.

See also
Canadian Dominion Land Survey

References

Further reading
 
 Johnson, Hildegard Binder. Order Upon the Land: The U. S. Rectangular Land Survey and the Upper Mississippi Country. Oxford University Press, 1976.

Surveying of the United States
Political divisions of the United States
Units of area
Customary units of measurement in the United States